The capped langur (Trachypithecus pileatus) is a species of primate in the family Cercopithecidae. It is native to Bangladesh, Bhutan, India, and Myanmar. Its natural habitat is subtropical or tropical dry forests. It is threatened by habitat loss. They are arboreal and gregarious by nature. A herd of capped langurs consists of 2 to 14 langurs led by a single male.  They are herbivorous, eating leaves, twigs, buds and fruits.

Taxonomy 
There are four recognized subspecies:
Trachypithecus pileatus pileatus
Trachypithecus pileatus durga
Trachypithecus pileatus brahma
Trachypithecus pileatus tenebricus

Behaviour and ecology 
A study of their diet in winter found that they spend nearly 40% of the day time feeding on leaves, flowers and fruits. Leaves contributed nearly 60% of the diet and they foraged on as many as 43 different plant species.

References

capped langur
Primates of South Asia
Mammals of Bangladesh
Mammals of Bhutan
Mammals of Myanmar
Mammals of China
Mammals of India
Mammals of Nepal
Monkeys in India
Vulnerable fauna of Asia
capped langur
capped langur
Taxonomy articles created by Polbot